The Miami Beach Bowl was a National Collegiate Athletic Association (NCAA) sanctioned Division I Football Bowl Subdivision (FBS) college football bowl game played for three years (2014–2016) at Marlins Park in Miami, Florida. The bowl was created and owned by the American Athletic Conference ("The American").

On April 21, 2017, it was announced that the Miami Beach Bowl had been sold to ESPN, would relocate to Frisco, Texas, and would be played at Toyota Stadium for the 2017 season. The new bowl game is named the Frisco Bowl.

Game results

MVPs

Appearances by team

Appearances by conference

Media coverage

Television

Radio

In 2014, the Miami Beach Bowl didn't provide a national radio carrier. As a result, both local schools broadcasts were made available through the regular platforms. The only nationwide broadcast available was the Cougar IMG Sports Network simulcast on BYU Radio – nationwide on Sirius XM 143, Dish Network 980, and byuradio.org. In 2015, Touchdown Radio Productions picked up the rights to air the game nationwide. In 2016, the bowl was again broadcast only by local stations.

See also
 List of college bowl games

References

External links
 

 
2014 establishments in Florida
2017 disestablishments in Florida
American football in Miami
Annual sporting events in the United States
Defunct college football bowls
Recurring sporting events established in 2014
Recurring sporting events disestablished in 2017